Mad Dog is a South Korean television series starring Yoo Ji-tae, Woo Do-hwan, and Ryu Hwa-young.  
It aired on KBS2, from October 11, 2017 to November 30, 2017 on Wednesdays and Thursdays at 22:00 (KST) for 16 episodes.

Synopsis 
Choi Kang-woo is a former police and leader of Taeyang Insurance's investigators team, decides to create his own investigation team, Mad Dog, after an airplane crash that took the life of his wife and son. Two years later, he meets Kim Min-joon, a genius former swindler who is the younger brother of Kim Beom-joon, the co-pilot of the crashed JH 801 airplane, who was touted of crashing the aircraft on purpose in a suicide attempt.

Cast

Main (Mad Dog) 
 Yoo Ji-tae as Choi Kang-woo / Mad Dog
An ex-cop and leader of the Mad Dog team. He has good eyes, sharp instinct which helps him achieve a 99% arrest rate. After meeting Kim Beom-joon's brother, he developed suspiciousness of his wife and son's death and decided to re-investigate the case.
 Woo Do-hwan as Kim Min-joon / Jan Gebauer / Doctor Kim
A genius former swindler who was abandoned by his German foster parents. He has wits and guts instinct, allowing him to transform into anybody. After 2 years, he returnes to South Korea to prove his brother's innocence.
 Ryu Hwa-young as Jang Ha-ri / Player Jang
A former competing gymnast skilled at disguising herself in order to investigate insurance fraud schemes.
 Jo Jae-yoon as Park Soon-jung / Cheetah
An ex thug with striking criminal records, who now becomes an insurance investigator dreams of becoming a pediatric nurse for his love of children. 
 Kim Hye-seong as On Nu-ri  / Pentium 
A computer genius who is allergic to the sun and hates going outside.
 Hong Soo-hyun as Cha Hong-joo 
Only daughter of Cha Joon-kyu and Director of Taeyang Insurance. She has a crush on Kang-woo but eventually decided to side with her father.

Supporting

Taeyang Life Insurance 
 Jeong Bo-seok as Cha Joon-kyu
Chairman of Taeyang Life Insurance. 
 Jang Hyuk-jin as Park Moo-shin
Kang-woo's best friend who still works at Taeyang Insurance.

Juhan Airlines 
Choi Won-young as Joo Hyun-gi
Vice-president of JH Airlines. He is extremely cunning in planning strategies against his enemy.

Others 
 Lee Jun-hyeok as Jo Han-woo
Kang-woo's fellow teammate back when he was a policeman.
Park In-hwan as Byun Gook-jin
Baek Ji-won as Oh Seo-ra
Kim Young-hoon as Kim Bum-joon
Kim Min-joon's older brother. Co-pilot of the crashed JH 801, who was accused of crashing the plane on purpose to take his own life.
Park Sung-hoon as Ko Jin Chul
Park Min-jung as Lee Young-mi

Production 
Gong Myung was initially offered the role of Kim Min-joon.

Original soundtrack

Part 1

Part 2

Part 3

Ratings 
 In this table,  represent the lowest ratings and  represent the highest ratings.
NR denotes that the drama did not rank in the top 20 daily programs on that date.

Awards and nominations

References

External links 
 
 
 

Korean Broadcasting System television dramas
Korean-language television shows
2017 South Korean television series debuts
2017 South Korean television series endings
South Korean action television series
South Korean thriller television series
Television series by Celltrion Entertainment
Television series by Imagine Asia